The bichon au citron is a French pastry. It is similar to a turnover in size, shape, and that it is made of puff pastry. A major distinguishing feature is that it is filled with lemon curd. The outer layer of sugar is sometimes partially caramelized.

See also

 List of pastries

References

French pastries
Puff pastry
Lemon dishes
Sweet pies